Kim Batten (born March 29, 1969, in McRae, Georgia) is an American former 400 meter hurdles champion. She was the 1995 world record holder in the women's 400-meter hurdles.

She played basketball at East High School in Rochester, New York. Batten graduated from the Florida State University in 1991, the same year she won her first national championship – the U.S. National Championships, the first of six national championships (1991, 1994, 1995, 1996, 1997, 1998).

Batten's finest year came in 1995, when she won Gold in the World Athletics Championships breaking the World Record for the 400m Hurdles in a time of 52.61 seconds. Batten also came first in the Pan American Games and first in the national indoor championships.

In 1996 she won silver in the 1996 Olympic Games and in 1997 won bronze in the World Athletics Championships. She was also a member of the 2000 US Olympic track team.

In 1999 an injury to a nerve in her foot caused her to miss most of the season. Batten retired at the end of the 2001 season.

Batten currently resides at Atlanta, GA. She was inducted into the National Track and Field Hall of Fame in 2012.

Records
 1991 US Outdoor Champion
 1994 US Outdoor Champion
 1995 US Outdoor Champion
 1995 World Champion at Gothenburg, Sweden
 1996 Olympic silver medal at Atlanta, Georgia
 1996 US Outdoor Champion
 1997 US Outdoor Champion
 1997 World bronze medal at Athens, Greece
 1998 World Cup bronze medal
 1998 US Outdoor Champion

References

 Kim Batten's athletic record at USATF
 Kim Batten's athletic statistics at eurosport.yahoo.com

Florida State Seminoles women's track and field athletes
1969 births
Living people
American female hurdlers
Athletes (track and field) at the 1995 Pan American Games
Athletes (track and field) at the 1996 Summer Olympics
Olympic silver medalists for the United States in track and field
World Athletics Championships medalists
People from McRae, Georgia
Track and field athletes from Georgia (U.S. state)
Medalists at the 1996 Summer Olympics
Pan American Games gold medalists for the United States
Pan American Games medalists in athletics (track and field)
World Athletics Championships athletes for the United States
Goodwill Games medalists in athletics
World Athletics Championships winners
Competitors at the 1998 Goodwill Games
Competitors at the 1994 Goodwill Games
Medalists at the 1995 Pan American Games
20th-century American women
21st-century American women